Paris Saint-Germain Football Club have had 17 presidents, of whom ten have won at least one trophy. Qatari businessman and Qatar Sports Investments chairman, Nasser Al-Khelaifi, is the current president. He has been in charge since November 2011.

Pierre-Étienne Guyot, elected in June 1970, was the club's first president. His tenure was short-lived but during his only season in charge PSG won their maiden trophy, the Ligue 2 title. Famous Parisian couturier Daniel Hechter joined the club in June 1973 as president of the management committee. He immediately left his mark on PSG by designing their iconic home jersey (known as « Hechter shirt »). Hechter became club president in June 1974 following the resignation of Henri Patrelle. He named fellow Frenchman Francis Borelli as vice-president.

Borelli assumed the presidency in 1978, after Hechter was banned for life from football by the French Football Federation (FFF). The latter was found guilty of running a ticketing scheme at Parc des Princes. Borelli went on to become the club's longest-serving president. During his 13 years in charge, PSG won their first major titles: two French Cups in 1982 and 1983, and the Ligue 1 title in 1986.

Emblematic club president in the 1990s, Michel Denisot, oversaw PSG's golden era. Between 1991 and 1998, the club won eight trophies, including their second league title in 1994 and their crowning glory, the UEFA Cup Winners' Cup in 1996. Denisot's record has since been eclipsed by Nasser Al-Khelaifi, the club's most successful president in terms of trophies won, with 29. Under his tenure, the Parisians have clinched eight Ligue 1 titles, six Coupe de France, six Coupe de la Ligue and nine Trophée des Champions. Most notably, PSG reached their first UEFA Champions League final in 2020.

Presidents

As of November 2011.

Honours

As of the 2022 Trophée des Champions.

References

External links

Official websites
PSG.FR - Site officiel du Paris Saint-Germain
Paris Saint-Germain - Ligue 1
Paris Saint-Germain - UEFA.com

Presidents